This is a list of the busiest railway stations in Great Britain on the National Rail network for the 1 April 2019 to 31 March 2020 financial year. The dataset for the year was the last to show typical patterns of mobility prior to the COVID-19 pandemic in the United Kingdom, with many major stations falling down the ranking the following year. During 2019–20 there were 1,739 million passenger journeys on the network. London Waterloo was the busiest station during the year, marking 16 years at the top of the ranking.

Methodology
The figures are collected by the Office of Rail and Road, and are estimates based on ticket usage data use of an Origin Destination Matrix, a comprehensive matrix of rail flows between stations throughout Great Britain in the financial year of 2019–20. The data count entries and exits at any station. Only tickets sold for National Rail services are included. As such, London Underground, special tours, local light rail and heritage railway tickets are excluded. Note that the data covers mainland Great Britain and surrounding small islands (such as the Isle of Wight), not the United Kingdom, and so exclude tickets within Northern Ireland and Eurostar. There are various further limits to the data due to the variety of ticketing options available on rail services within the UK; these are outlined in full in the report on the data. Data for 2019–20 was published on 1 December 2020.

All stations
Only stations with annual entries and exits above 10 million passengers are shown.

See also
List of busiest railway stations in Great Britain (2020–21) 
List of busiest railway stations in Great Britain for 2021–22 data
List of busiest London Underground stations
List of busiest railway stations in Europe
List of busiest railway stations in North America
List of busiest railway stations in West Yorkshire

Notes

References

External links
Station usage - Main page

 
Busiest railway stations in Great Britain